The Brunegg Glacier is a  long glacier (2005) situated in the Pennine Alps in the canton of Valais in Switzerland. The glacier is located north of Bishorn and Weisshorn.

See also
List of glaciers in Switzerland
Swiss Alps

External links
Swiss glacier monitoring network

Glaciers of the Alps
Glaciers of Valais